Bibha Chowdhuri (3 July 1913 – 2 June 1991) was an Indian physicist. She worked on particle physics and cosmic rays. The IAU has re-christened the star HD 86081 as Bibha (a yellow-white dwarf star in the constellation Sextans south of the celestial equator) after her.

Early life and education 
Chowdhuri was born in Kolkata. Her father, Banku Behari Chowdhuri, was a doctor and her mother Urmila Devi was daughter of a Brahmo Samaj Missionary. She was the third eldest child, and had four sisters and a brother. Her aunt, Nirmala Devi, was married to Sir Nilratan Sircar. Her mother's family were adherents of the Brahmo Samaj movement. Her sister, Roma Chowdhuri, went on to become a teacher at Brahmo Balika Shikshalaya.

Bibha studied physics at Rajabazar Science College of Calcutta University and was the only woman to complete M.Sc. degree in the year 1936. She joined the Bose Institute after graduating in 1939 and worked with Debendra Mohan Bose. Together, they experimentally observed muons and published on cosmic rays. She studied batches of Ilford half-tone plates that were exposed to cosmic rays at different altitudes. She noticed that the decays were curved, likely due to multiple scattering of particles. They could not take the investigation further because there were not more sensitive emulsion plates available. Chowdhuri joined the laboratory of Patrick Blackett for her doctoral studies, working on cosmic rays at the University of Manchester. Her PhD thesis investigated extensive air showers. Her examiner was Lajos Jánossy.  It is unclear how much her work contributed to Blackett's Nobel Prize.

Career and research
Chowdhuri demonstrated that the density of penetrating events is proportional to the total particle density of an extensive air shower. She was interviewed by the The Manchester Herald in an article called "Meet India's New Woman Scientist — She has an eye for cosmic rays", saying that "it is a tragedy that we have so few women physicists today."

Chowdhuri returned to India after her PhD, working at the Tata Institute of Fundamental Research for eight years. In 1954 she was a visiting researcher at the University of Michigan. She was appointed because Homi Bhabha was still establishing the Tata Institute of Fundamental Research, and contacted her thesis examiners for advice on outstanding graduate students. She joined the Physical Research Laboratory and became involved with the Kolar Gold Fields experiments. She moved to Kolkata to work at the Saha Institute of Nuclear Physics. She taught physics in French.

Her life was described in the books A Jewel Unearthed: Bibha Chowdhuri. and Bibha Chowdhuri, eine indische Hochenergiephysikerin als "Star" am Himmel. She was described by The Statesman as a forgotten legend. She continued to publish until she died in 1991.

References 

Indian women scientists
Bengali physicists
Indian particle physicists
University of Calcutta alumni
Alumni of the University of Manchester
People from Kolkata
1913 births
1991 deaths
Women scientists from West Bengal